"The Rose of No Man's Land" (or in French ) is a song written as a tribute to the Red Cross nurses at the front lines of the First World War.

A version with English lyrics by Jack Caddigan and James Alexander Brennan was published by Jack Mendelsohn Music in 1945 (two pages). Herman Darewski and others also published versions in 1918 and 1945.

While the main published versions were for piano and voice, other versions were arranged for band, orchestra or male quartette.  Mechanicals for the phonograph and player piano were also released.

English lyrics
Written by Jack Caddigan and James Alexander Brennan:

French lyrics
Written by Louis Delamarre:

References
In Jacqueline Winspear's novel "Maisie Dobbs", the title character sings this song to a group of badly disfigured veterans of World War I in England.
 (sheet music) at Duke University

1918 songs
Songs of World War I
Songs with lyrics by Jack Caddigan